Parvoscincus beyeri, also known commonly as Beyer's sphenomorphus,  is a species of skink, a lizard in the family Scincidae. The species is endemic to the Philippines.

Etymology
The specific name, beyeri, is in honor of American ethnologist Henry Otley Beyer.

Geographic range
In the Philippines, P. beyeri is found on the island of Luzon.

Habitat

Description
Dorsally, it is brown with white spots. Ventrally, it is bright golden yellow.

Behavior
P. beyeri hides in leaf litter and thick moss, and under rotten fallen logs, on the forest floor.

Reproduction
The mode of reproduction of P. beyeri is unknown.

References

Further reading
Brown RM, Ferner JW, Sison RV (1995). "Rediscovery and redescription of Sphenomorphus beyeri Taylor (Reptilia: Lacertilia: Scincidae) from the Zambales Mountains of Luzon, Philippines". Proceedings of the Biological Society of Washington 108 (1): 6–17.
Linkem CW, Diesmos AC, Brown RM (2011). "Molecular systematics of the Philippine forest skinks (Squamata: Scincidae: Sphenomorphus): testing morphological hypotheses of interspecific relationships". Zoological Journal of the Linnean Society 163: 1217–1243. (Parvoscincus beyeri, new combination).
Taylor EH (1922). "Additions to the herpetological fauna of the Philippine Islands, II". Philippine Journal of Science 21: 257–303 + Plates 1–4. (Sphenomorphus beyeri, new species, pp. 283–285).

Parvoscincus
Reptiles described in 1922
Taxa named by Edward Harrison Taylor